Henry Augustus Marshall (c. 1776 – 23 January 1841) was a British colonial administrator in British Ceylon.

Life
Marshall was educated at Harrow and Charterhouse Schools and at Christ Church, Oxford.

He went out to Ceylon to join the Civil Service there in 1798 and served as a provincial judge. He became Controller-General of Customs in 1816 and was then appointed the 10th Civil Auditor General of Ceylon in 1823, succeeding J. W. Carrington. He held that office until his death in 1841, when he was succeeded by Henry Wright.

Marshall died of fever in Munwal and was buried in Galle Face Cemetery, Colombo. He had married Elizabeth Brooke and had two sons: Henry and John.

References

1770s births
1841 deaths
Year of birth uncertain
People educated at Harrow School
People educated at Charterhouse School
Alumni of Christ Church, Oxford
Auditors General of Sri Lanka
British colonial governors and administrators in Asia
Sri Lankan people of British descent
People from British Ceylon